Eileen Roe (born 24 September 1989) is a Scottish racing cyclist, who most recently rode professionally for UCI Women's Team . Roe was the winner of the 2014 and 2016 British National Circuit Race Championships.

Biography 
Born in Dunfermline, Roe began competitive cycling at the age of 10. She has been employed at the Edinburgh Bicycle Cooperative on a part-time basis for several years, which allowed her the time to dedicate to her cycling career. In October 2014 the  team announced that Roe would join them with immediate effect to ride in the Australian criterium season and the subsequent 2015 season. Roe joined Belgian team  for the 2016 season.
From 2017, Roe became a member of the  squad.

Major results 

2008
 1st  800m, National Grass Track Championships
2012
 1st Round 3, Johnson Health Tech Grand Prix Series, Colchester
 2nd National Criterium Championships
 National Track Championships
3rd Madison
3rd Team pursuit
2013
 2nd Overall Surf & Turf Weekend
1st Stage 3
 2nd Points race, Revolution – Round 2, Glasgow
 3rd Road race, Scottish Road Championships
2014
 1st  National Criterium Championships
 1st Overall Matrix Fitness Grand Prix Series
1st Round 2, Peterborough
1st Round 5, Woking
 3rd Stan Siejka Launceston Cycling Classic
2015
 2nd National Criterium Championships
 2nd Overall Rás na mBan
1st Stage 6
 2nd Women's Tour de Yorkshire
 2nd London Nocturne
 10th Marianne Vos Classic
2016
 1st  National Criterium Championships
 1st Round 1, Matrix Fitness Grand Prix Series, Motherwell
 3rd Dwars door Vlaanderen
 9th Overall BeNe Ladies Tour

References

External links 
 Profile and diaries at the Braveheart Cycling Fund

1989 births
Living people
Scottish female cyclists
Scottish track cyclists
Sportspeople from Fife
Cyclists at the 2010 Commonwealth Games
Cyclists at the 2014 Commonwealth Games
Cyclists at the 2018 Commonwealth Games
Commonwealth Games competitors for Scotland
Sportspeople from Dunfermline